Wiedikon is a district in the Swiss city of Zurich. It corresponds to District number 3 and comprises the neighborhoods of Alt-Wiedikon, Sihlfeld and Friesenberg.

Wiedikon was formerly a municipality of its own, having been incorporated into Zurich in 1893.

Transportation
The municipality is located on the A3 motorway. Zürich Wiedikon railway station is a stop of the Zürich S-Bahn on the lines S2, S8 and S21. The head office of Sihltal Zürich Uetliberg Bahn (SZU) is located in Wiedikon.

References 

3
Former municipalities of the canton of Zürich